Terrell May (born 29 April 1999) is an Australian professional rugby league footballer who plays as a  for the Sydney Roosters in the NRL.

Background
May was born in Blacktown and played his junior rugby league for the Minchinbury Jets in the Penrith District Rugby League. 

May's brothers Tyrone and Taylan are also professional rugby league players.

He is of Samoan and European descent.

Career

2022
May made his first grade debut for the Roosters against the Panthers in round 11 of the 2022 NRL season, in a 32-12 loss.

References

External links
Roosters profile

1999 births
Living people
Australian rugby league players
Australian sportspeople of Samoan descent
Terrell
Sydney Roosters players
Rugby league players from Blacktown
Rugby league props
Western Suburbs Magpies NSW Cup players